Dick Van Dyke and The Vantastix is an a cappella quartet based in Los Angeles, CA.  Formed in 2000, after a chance meeting at a coffee shop, the group has performed at a number of benefit and charity events, and released a children's album Put On A Happy Face in 2008, produced by BAMP productions.

Members 

 Dick Van Dyke — lead vocals. Van Dyke is an actor, dancer, singer, and comedian of film, television, and Broadway fame. Van Dyke sings lead on all but one of the Vantastix songs, and during live performances uses choreography similar to the style of his movies and in one instance "pop-n-loc".
 Eric Bradley — all around vocals. Bradley is a vocalist, voice-over actor, and studio singer originally from Connecticut. He also performs with a cappella group, Sixth Wave.
 Bryan Chadima — tenor. Chadima is a vocalist and actor who sings high tenor for the group, as well as the vocal percussionist. Chadima also performs in the goth-rock opera musical Vox Lumiere, arranges most of the Vantastix songs, and is one half of the production company BAMP.
 Mike Mendyke — bass. Mendyke is a graduate of MIT and former NASA engineer who now performs full-time and is one half of the production company, BAMP.

Put on a Happy Face 
The Vantastix album released in late 2008.

 "Put on a Happy Face" 1:57
 "You've Got a Friend in Me" 2:16
 "Chitty Chitty Bang Bang" 1:42
 "Baby of Mine" 3:28
 "High Hopes" 2:55
 "The Bare Necessities" 2:13
 "Pick Yourself Up" 1:25
 "A Lover's Question" 1:58
 "It's Not Easy Being Green" 1:45
 "Supercalifragilisticexpialidocious" 1:51
 "Ac-Cent-Tchu-Ate the Positive" 3:01
 "Theme from the Dick Van Dyke Show" 1:15
 "A Visit from St. Nicholas" 3:18
 "Old Fashioned Christmas" 2:35

References
Geffen Playhouse Dick Van Dyke and The Vantastix perform at the Geffen Playhouse
The Wall Street Journal Dick Van Dyke talks about his Geffen Playhouse show featuring his quartet.
Broadway World Dick Van Dyke interview about his show with his guys from his Vantasix group.
LA Times Dick Van Dyke's new show with his singing quartet.
IMDB Dick Van Dyke and The Vantastix on IMDB
USA Today Dick Van Dyke thanks The Wellness Community as The Vantastix sing a song from Mary Poppins
Moorpark Acorn Dick Van Dyke and The Vantastix support a Los Angeles charity
Library Foundation of Los Angeles The Vantastix sing at Gregory Peck Reading Series
New Directions For Youth The Vantastix perform to support a worthy Los Angeles cause
The Thousand Oaks Acorn The Vantastix support  local high schools
CNN The Vantastix sing for Mary Tyler Moore on Larry King Live
Yahoo Movies Dick Van Dyke and The Vantastix on Yahoo Movies
The Acorn 2004 Article about The Vantastix
This Day in Disney History Dick Van Dyke and The Vantastix perform for the Sherman Brothers
Harmonize.com The Vantastix win the Probe Outstanding Achievement Award

External links
Official Website Dick Van Dyke and The Vantastix
High School Benefit Dick Van Dyke and The Vantastix perform in Thousand Oaks benefit
The Walnut Times The Dick Van Dyke Show Newsletter and The Vantastix
The Hallmark Channel Murder 101 Bio featuring Dick Van Dyke and The Vantastix 

A cappella musical groups